Joseph Arthur Harold Dorsett (11 April 1888 – 15 March 1951) was an English professional footballer who made over 130 appearances in the Football League for Manchester City as a forward. He also played league football for Millwall, Southend United and West Bromwich Albion.

Personal life 
Dorsett was the brother of George Dorsett and the uncle of Dicky Dorsett and Ted Sagar. He served as a driver in the Royal Engineers during the First World War.

Career statistics

References

1888 births
1951 deaths
People from Brownhills
English footballers
Association football outside forwards
West Bromwich Albion F.C. players
Manchester City F.C. players
Colne F.C. players
Southend United F.C. players
Millwall F.C. players
English Football League players
Association football forwards
British Army personnel of World War I
Royal Engineers soldiers
Military personnel from Staffordshire